Abu language may refer to:
Abu’ Arapesh language (Papua New Guinea)
Adjora language (Papua New Guinea)
Bu language (Nigeria)

See also
 Abure language, a Tano language of Ivory Coast (ISO code)